Bossard Arena is an indoor sporting arena located in Zug, Switzerland.  The capacity of the arena is 7,200 spectators and opened in 2010.  It hosts indoor sporting events such as ice hockey. It hosts the EV Zug of the National League (NL). It replaced Eishalle Herti as the home of EV Zug. The venue takes is named after Bossard Holding, an international logistics company headquartered in the city.

Size issues
The arena has faced many critics from EV Zug management and fans for being too limited in terms of capacity. In the summer of 2017, EV Zug added an additional 200 seats close to the boards, on ice level. At the beginning of the 2019-20 season, EVZ CEO Patrick Lengwiler expressed his intentions to the city of Zug, the current owner of the Arena, to extend the capacity to 9,000. The team is currently forced to limit season tickets sales to 6,000 due to the small capacity and could benefits economically from an extension as demand is high in Zug with the team being very popular.

The issue was again brought back in the media in September 2020 to try and make the city of Zug act quickly.

See also
 List of indoor arenas in Switzerland

References

External links

 

Indoor arenas in Switzerland
Zug
Buildings and structures in the canton of Zug
Sports venues completed in 2010
Handball venues in Switzerland
21st-century architecture in Switzerland